"Kesklinn" is the Estonian word for the centre of a city or town. It may refer to the following places:
 Kesklinn, Tallinn
 Kesklinn, Tartu